Jeffrey Donald Doyle (born October 2, 1956) is a former Major League Baseball second baseman.

Career
At Oregon State, Doyle set single-season records for runs, triples and stolen bases.

Doyle began his professional career in 1977 with the Calgary Cardinals but suffered a knee injury that season which required two surgeries and forced him to miss the entire 1978 season.

On September 13, 1983 Doyle made his major league debut as a pinch hitter at Three Rivers Stadium.  Batting for pitcher Dave Von Ohlen in the 5th inning against Pirates right-hander Rick Rhoden, he lined out to shortstop Dale Berra.  He made his first appearance in the starting lineup on September 17, and went 2-for-3 against Philadelphia Phillies starter John Denny at Veterans Stadium. The Phils won, 4–1.

Doyle put up good numbers during his short stay in the big leagues.  In 13 games he went 11-for-37 (.297) with a double, two triples, and two runs batted in.  He scored four runs and had a slugging percentage of .432.  In the field he handled 57 out of 59 chances successfully and turned 11 double plays.

He was released by St. Louis on December 15, 1983.

Personal life
Doyle married Oregon State Beavers tennis player Liz Toole, with whom he had at least one child.

Doyle built, owns and operates Diamond Woods Golf Course in Monroe, Oregon.  Doyle's brother Greg designed the golf course.

References

External links

Baseball Almanac

1956 births
Living people
Major League Baseball second basemen
Baseball players from Montana
St. Louis Cardinals players
Calgary Cardinals players
Oregon State Beavers baseball players
Nankai Hawks players
American expatriate baseball players in Japan
People from Havre, Montana
Alaska Goldpanners of Fairbanks players
Arkansas Travelers players
Gastonia Cardinals players
Louisville Redbirds players
St. Petersburg Cardinals players